Leucine-rich repeats and death domain containing 1 is a protein that in humans is encoded by the LRRD1 gene.

References

Further reading 

Genes
Human proteins